Heroes Stadium is an 11,000-seat, open style football stadium serving the public school district North East ISD in San Antonio, Texas, USA. It opened in 2009, built on the  site of the abandoned Longhorn Quarry, and has 2,525 paved parking spaces.  $27.5 million of funding was provided by a 2007 school district bond. Along with Comalander Stadium, Heroes is the home venue for the football, track and field, soccer, and band events for the high schools in the North East Independent School District, and also plays host to various athletic events for the district's middle and elementary schools.

The stadium received national exposure on August 27, 2010, when it held a game between local Madison Mavericks and Steele Knights of Cibolo. The game was televised by ESPN, as part of its High School Rise Kickoff Event.

The venue hosted the San Antonio Scorpions in their inaugural 2012 NASL season.  The team played at the site to an average attendance of 9,176, including a couple of sellout crowds, while their stadium, Toyota Field, was being completed.

References

External links
 Texas Bob Stadium Reference Page

North American Soccer League stadiums
North East Independent School District
Sports venues in San Antonio
High school football venues in Texas
Sports venues completed in 2009
Soccer venues in Texas
2009 establishments in Texas